Lindeman is a German, Dutch, Norwegian and Swedish surname.

Geographical distribution
As of 2014, 58.8% of all known bearers of the surname Lindeman were residents of the United States (frequency 1:55,620), 16.5% of the Netherlands (1:9,286), 7.6% of Finland (1:6,521), 3.5% of Australia (1:61,911), 3.0% of Sweden (1:29,570), 2.1% of Russia (1:621,945) and 1.9% of Canada (1:176,067).

In Finland, the frequency of the surname was higher than national average (1:6,521) in the following regions:
 1. Åland (1:1,009)
 2. Central Finland (1:2,029)
 3. Southwest Finland (1:3,518)
 4. Päijänne Tavastia (1:4,148)
 5. Pirkanmaa (1:4,156)
 6. Kainuu (1:5,120)
 7. Ostrobothnia (1:5,607)
 8. Kymenlaakso (1:6,104)
 9. Tavastia Proper (1:6,190)

In the Netherlands, the frequency of the surname was higher than national average (1:9,286) in the following provinces:
 1. Groningen (1:4,317)
 2. Drenthe (1:6,121)
 3. Utrecht (1:6,514)
 4. North Holland (1:6,629)
 5. Flevoland (1:6,662)
 6. South Holland (1:8,411)

In Sweden, the frequency of the surname was higher than national average (1:29,570) in the following counties:
 1. Västmanland County (1:7,860)
 2. Örebro County (1:10,186)
 3. Södermanland County (1:10,341)
 4. Norrbotten County (1:20,901)
 5. Östergötland County (1:23,031)
 6. Västernorrland County (1:24,396)
 7. Värmland County (1:25,221)
 8. Stockholm County (1:28,045)
 9. Uppsala County (1:29,147)

People
Bert-Jan Lindeman (b. 1989), Dutch road bicycle racer 
Douglas (D. L.) Lindeman (b. 1968), American novelist
Eduard C. Lindeman (1885–1953), American educator
Fredrik Otto Lindeman (b. 1936), Norwegian linguist (a.o. known for Lindeman's law)
Henry Lindeman (1902–1961), American woodwind player a.o. known for the Lindeman-Sobel approach
Jan Christiaan Lindeman (1921-2007), Dutch botanist
Jim Lindeman (b. 1962), American baseball player
Kurt Lindeman (b. 1932), Finnish fencer
Lars Lindeman (1920–2006), Finnish politician
Ludvig Mathias Lindeman (1812–1887), Norwegian composer and organist
Ole Andreas Lindeman (1769–1857), Norwegian organist and music teacher
Osmo Lindeman (1929–1987), Finnish composer and music pedagogue
Peter Brynie Lindeman (1858–1930), Norwegian organist, composer, and cellist
Raymond Lindeman (1915–1942), American ecologist
Tamara Lindeman (b. 1984), Canadian actress and musician
Trygve Lindeman (1896–1979), Norwegian cellist and conservatory director
William Lindeman (1794–1875), German piano manufacturer

Places
The Lindeman Islands, part of the Whitsunday Islands. These include Lindeman Island, and form Lindeman Islands National Park
Lindeman, a Klondike Gold Rush era settlement along Lindeman Lake (Chilkoot Trail) in British Columbia, Canada
Lindeman Fjord, Greenland

Other
Lindeman (characters), created by Hasse Alfredson
Lindemans Brewery, maker of Lambic beer

See also
Lindeman Lake (disambiguation)
Lindemann
Lindemans

References

Dutch-language surnames
Norwegian-language surnames
Swedish-language surnames